Matthew Craske is an art historian at Oxford Brookes University. He is art adviser to the Church of England Diocese of Oxford. He received his PhD in 1992 from University College, London for a thesis titled, "The London trade in monumental sculpture and the imagery of the family in monumental art, 1720-1760".

Selected publications
Art in Europe 1700-1830: A history of the visual arts in an era of unprecedented urban growth. Oxford University Press, Oxford, 1997. 
William Hogarth. Tate Publishing, London, 2000. 
Pantheons: Transformations of a monumental idea. Ashgate, Aldershot, 2004. (Edited with Richard Wrigley) 
The silent rhetoric of the body: A history of monumental sculpture and commemorative art in England, 1720-70. Yale University Press, New Haven, 2008.

References 

Living people
Academics of Oxford Brookes University
Alumni of University College London
Year of birth missing (living people)